Stoney—also called Nakota, Nakoda, Isga, and formerly Alberta Assiniboine—is a member of the Dakota subgroup of the Mississippi Valley grouping of the Siouan languages. The Dakotan languages constitute a dialect continuum consisting of Santee-Sisseton (Dakota), Yankton-Yanktonai (Dakota), Teton (Lakota), Assiniboine, and Stoney.

Stoney is the most linguistically divergent of the Dakotan dialects and has been described as "on the verge of becoming a separate language". The Stoneys are the only Siouan people that live entirely in Canada, and the Stoney language is spoken by five groups in Alberta. No official language survey has been undertaken for every community where Stoney is spoken, but the language may be spoken by as many as a few thousand people, primarily at the Morley community.

Relationship to Assiniboine
Stoney’s closest linguistic relative is Assiniboine. The two have often been confused with each other due to their close historical and linguistic relationship, but they are not mutually intelligible. Stoney either developed from Assiniboine, or both Stoney and Assiniboine developed from a common ancestor language.

Phonology
Very little linguistic documentation and descriptive research has been done on Stoney. However, Stoney varieties demonstrate broad phonological similarity with some important divergences.

For example, the following phonemes are reportedly found in Morley Stoney, spoken on the Morley Reserve:

For comparison, these phonemes reportedly characterize the Stoney spoken at Alexis Nakota Sioux Nation, which maintains the common Siouan three-way contrast between plain, aspirated, and ejective stops:

Notice that Alexis Stoney, for example, has innovated contrastive vowel length, which is not found in other Dakotan dialects. Alexis Stoney also has long and nasal mid vowels:

Writing system

Word set (includes numbers) 

 One — 
 Two — 
 Three — 
 Four — 
 Five — 
 Man — 
 Woman — 
 Sun — 
 Moon — 
 Water —

Phonetic differences from other Dakotan languages 
The following table shows some of the main phonetic differences between Stoney, Assiniboine, and the three dialects (Lakota, Yankton-Yanktonai and Santee-Sisseton) of Sioux.

References

External links

 Ethnologue.com
 Native Languages of the Americas website

Indigenous languages of the North American Plains
First Nations languages in Canada
Western Siouan languages
Indigenous languages of Montana